James Herbert Sinclair (October 9, 1871 – September 5, 1943) was a U.S. Republican politician.

He was born near St. Marys, Ontario, Canada and moved to North Dakota in 1883.  He was elected to North Dakota's State House of Representatives between 1915 and 1919 and then as a Republican member of North Dakota's congressional delegation for 8 consecutive terms between 1919 and 1935.

Sources

1871 births
1943 deaths
People from St. Mary's, Ontario
Canadian emigrants to the United States
Republican Party members of the United States House of Representatives from North Dakota